Berat Sadik (born 14 September 1986) is a Finnish footballer who plays as a striker for Doxa Katokopias.

Early life
Sadik was born in Skopje, SR Macedonia, then still part of former Yugoslavia, on 14 September 1986 to Albanian parents and moved to Finland with his family at the age of three.

Career
On 16 June 2008, it was published that Arminia Bielefeld was keen to sign him. Also Ascoli, Torino, Larissa, Örebro and Rosenborg were interested to sign Sadik. After visiting Ascoli and Bielefeld he chose to sign a three-year contract with Arminia. In December 2007, he was on trial to Vicenza Calcio. After just one year, he left Arminia Bielefeld, where he played only thirteen games, and joined SV Zulte Waregem on loan for 10 months. He was released by Bielefeld in August 2010 and he rejoined the Veikkausliiga strugglers FC Lahti on 24 August 2010. He celebrated his comeback by scoring in his first appearance in a 1–1 draw against JJK.

On 31 January 2011, Sadik signed a two-year contract with HJK. He finished the season with 15 goals, being the club's second-best goalscorer, one goal behind Akseli Pelvas.

On 22 January 2019, Sadik signed an 18-month deal with Segunda División side Gimnàstic de Tarragona. On 5 August, after suffering relegation, he terminated his contract.

International career
Sadik debuted for Finland national football team against Turkey on 29 May 2008.

Career statistics

Club

International goals

|-
| 1. || 29 March 2015 || Windsor Park, Belfast, Northern Ireland ||  ||  ||  || UEFA Euro 2016 qualifying
|}

References

External links
 Berat Sadik at Arminia's  official website 
 
 

1986 births
Living people
Footballers from Skopje
Association football forwards
Finnish footballers
Finnish expatriate footballers
Finland international footballers
Finland under-21 international footballers
Finnish people of Albanian descent
Finnish people of Macedonian descent
Albanian footballers from North Macedonia
FC Lahti players
Arminia Bielefeld players
S.V. Zulte Waregem players
Helsingin Jalkapalloklubi players
FC Thun players
PFC Krylia Sovetov Samara players
Kuopion Palloseura players
Doxa Katokopias FC players
Gimnàstic de Tarragona footballers
Veikkausliiga players
Bundesliga players
Swiss Super League players
Segunda División players
Russian Premier League players
Cypriot First Division players
Expatriate footballers in Germany
Finnish expatriate sportspeople in Germany
Expatriate footballers in Belgium
Finnish expatriate sportspeople in Belgium
Expatriate footballers in Switzerland
Finnish expatriate sportspeople in Switzerland
Expatriate footballers in Russia
Finnish expatriate sportspeople in Russia
Expatriate footballers in Cyprus
Finnish expatriate sportspeople in Cyprus
Expatriate footballers in Spain
Finnish expatriate sportspeople in Spain
Macedonian emigrants to Finland